Mordellistena macropphthalma is a species of beetles is the family Mordellidae.

References

macrophthalma